Çamlıköy may refer to:

 Kalo Chorio (Çamlıköy)
 Çamlıköy, Kaş